The Most Esteemed Royal Family Order of Johor (Bahasa Melayu : Darjah Kerabat Johor Yang Amat Dihormati), is a chivalrous order awarded by the Sultan of Johor.

History  
It was first instituted by Sultan Sir Abu Bakar of Johor on 31 July 1886.

Classes  
It is awarded in two classes:
 First Class (Grand Commander) - Pangkat Yang Pertama (DK I)
 Second Class (Commander) - Pangkat Yang Kedua (DK II)

 First Class (Grand Commander) - Pangkat Yang Pertama (DK I)
Is awarded to members of the Royal Family of Johor and the other Royal Rulers and Consorts or other members to other Royal Families that have done immensely to the servititude to the Sultan and the Family.

It is awarded as a set of a nine rayed breast star, a collar with a lesser star, a yellow silk sash, worn from the right shoulder to the left waist and a lesser star for the sash.

 Second Class (Commander) - Pangkat Yang Kedua (DK II)
It is awarded to junior members of the Royal Families like the Pengirans, Tunkus, Tengkus, Rajas and Syeds.

It is awarded as a set of a seven rayed breast star with a neck ribbon with a lesser star suspended on it.

Notable recipients

See also 
 Orders, decorations, and medals of the Malaysian states and federal territories#Johor
 Order of precedence in Johor
 List of post-nominal letters (Johor)

References 
Sources :

 
Orders, decorations, and medals of Johor
Johor, Royal Family Order of